Haploesthes greggii, common name false broomweed, is a North American species of flowering plants in the family Asteraceae. It grows in northeastern Mexico (Chihuahua, Coahuila and Nuevo León) and in the south-central and southwestern United States (Texas, Oklahoma, New Mexico; also historical reports of the species in Colorado and Kansas but very likely extirpated there).

The genus name is sometimes spelled Haploësthes, with two dots over the first e to indicate that the o and the e are to be pronounced in separate syllables. This is optional; either spelling is equally acceptable.

Leaves are very narrow, sometimes thread-like. The plant produces numerous yellow flower heads in flat-topped arrays. Each head has 3–6 ray flowers and 18-100 disc flowers.

Varieties
Haploesthes greggii var. greggii 
Haploesthes greggii var. texana (J.M.Coult.) I.M.Johnst.

References

External links
Photo of herbarium specimen collected in Nuevo León in 1996

Tageteae
Flora of Chihuahua (state)
Flora of Coahuila
Flora of New Mexico
Flora of Nuevo León
Flora of Oklahoma
Flora of Texas
Plants described in 1849
Taxa named by Asa Gray
Flora without expected TNC conservation status